89th meridian may refer to:

89th meridian east, a line of longitude east of the Greenwich Meridian
89th meridian west, a line of longitude west of the Greenwich Meridian